Comix-ART (Komiks-Art) is a comics imprint of Russian book publisher Domino. It serves as a translator and the licensor of graphic novels, manga, manhwa and original English-language manga. Comix-ART, founded in 2008 with headquarters in Saint Petersburg, releases its titles in collaboration with Eksmo, another publishing house, and their books are published under "Eksmo" label. They do not reverse the pages (so called "flopping").

Comix-ART has been repeatedly criticized for the choice of fonts used to display letters inside the word balloons and for the placing of words in bubbles. AniMag editor commented on their publication of Naruto that a reader cannot distinguish some letters "without a magnifying glass".

Licenses

Manga
Bleach (1st volume released 2008-12-09) 11/44+
Naruto (1st volume released 2008-11-28) 17/50+
Death Note (1st volume released 2008-10-13) 10/12
Princess Ai
Doors of Chaos
Yato no Kamitsukai 7/12
Gravitation 2/12
Red Garden 4/4
Case File
Category: Freaks 4/4
Drug-On 5/5
 Dragon Ball 8/42
C-R-O-S-S 3/3
Shinshoku Kiss 2/2
Made in Heaven 2/2
 Fruits Basket 4/23
 Berserk 6/35+
 Angel Sanctuary 3/20
 Claymore 10/18+
 Kyoko Karasuma no Jikenbo - 8/9+
 Hellsing 3/10
 Trigun 2/2
 Trigun Maximum
 Vampire Knight 8/15+
 Skip Beat! 3/25+
 Trinity Blood
 Blood + 5/5
 X 6/18
 One Piece
 Fullmetal Alchemist

Manhwa
Devil's Bride

OEL manga
Warcraft: The Sunwell Trilogy
StarCraft
Shutterbox
Bizenghast
Van Von Hunter
The Dreaming
Dark Metro (1st volume released 2008-12-19)
Nightschool

Comic books
The Sandman by Neil Gaiman.
Lucifer by Mike Carey.

Graphic novels
Artemis Fowl: The Graphic Novel
World of WarCraft

References

External links
 Official website .

Manga distributors
Manhwa distributors
Companies based in Saint Petersburg
Publishing companies established in 2008
Comic book publishing companies of Russia
2008 establishments in Russia